The 1993 Copa de Oro was the inaugural Copa de Oro, a football competition for the reigning champions of CONMEBOL's Copa Libertadores, the Supercopa Libertadores, the Copa CONMEBOL, and the Copa Master de Supercopa. It was played from July 7 to July 22.

This tournament was disputed between São Paulo, winners of the 1992 Copa Libertadores, Cruzeiro, winners of the 1992 Supercopa Libertadores, Atlético Mineiro, winners of the 1992 Copa CONMEBOL, and Boca Juniors, winners of the 1992 Copa Master de Supercopa). Boca Juniors won the final 4–1 on points over Atlético Mineiro as Carlos MacAllister scored the only goal of the two-legged final. Sergio Daniel Martínez, top scorer, scored the first goal of the tournament and also became the first person to score a golden goal in a CONMEBOL tournament.

Qualified teams

Knockout bracket

Semifinals

First leg

Second leg

Finals

First leg

Second leg

Top goalscorers
2 goals
 Sergio Daniel Martínez
1 goal
 Carlos MacAllister
 Gustavo Matosas

References

External links
1993 Copa de Oro at RSSSF

1993
1993 in South American football
1993 in Brazilian football
1993–94 in Argentine football